Robert Charles Holm (January 22, 1919 – April 14, 2002) was an American professional basketball player. He played in the National Basketball League for the Sheboygan Red Skins and Hammond Calumet Buccaneers and averaged 5.2 points per game. He also played in the American Basketball League, the New York State Professional Basketball League, and the Professional Basketball League of America.

Bobby Holm is the cousin of Olympic gold medalist swimmer Eleanor Holm.

References

1919 births
2002 deaths
American Basketball League (1925–1955) players
American men's basketball players
Basketball players from New York City
Guards (basketball)
Hammond Calumet Buccaneers players
Professional Basketball League of America players
Seton Hall Pirates men's basketball players
Sheboygan Red Skins players
Sportspeople from Brooklyn